This is a list of the most notable films produced in Cinema of Germany in the 1990s.

For an alphabetical list of articles on German films see :Category:1990s German films.

1990

1991

1992

1993

1994

1995

1996

1997

1998

1999

References

External links
 German film at the Internet Movie Database (maintains separate lists for West Germany and East Germany)

1990s
Lists of 1990s films
Films
Ostalgie